The Véhicule Blindé de Combat d'Infanterie (English: Armoured Infantry Fighting Vehicle) or VBCI is a French Infantry fighting vehicle designed and manufactured by GIAT Industries (now Nexter Systems) and Renault Trucks Defense to replace the AMX-10P. The first units entered active service with the French Army in 2008. 630 units were ordered and full delivery was completed in 2018. Spain and the UK have notably shown interest in acquiring the vehicle but ultimately opted for domestic options instead.

The VBCI is built on an aluminium hull which carries a modular THD steel and titanium armour that can be replaced in the field. The 8x8 wheeled design was chosen to make the VBCI more comfortable, less costly as well as easier to maintain on war theaters than a tracked vehicle would be, while giving it sufficient mobility to complement the Leclerc tank. The VBCI is also designed to be transportable by the Airbus A400M, thanks to an empty mass of less than 18 tons.

History 

In the early 1990s, the French government started the VBM (Véhicule Blindé Modulaire — Modular Armoured Vehicle) as a replacement for its older IFVs. Soon, Germany and the United Kingdom joined the project. At Eurosatory 1996, Renault unveiled the X8A, an eight-wheeled prototype in this perspective.

However, in 1999, the programme came to a dead-end, and France decided to carry on on its own and ordered 700 vehicles on 6 November 2000. In 2003–2004, the programme reached some major milestones: The mobility/agility tests, the armour tests and the electronic systems tests were all successful. From 2004 to 2005, the first 5 prototypes (4 VCIs and 1 VPC) were tested in real conditions. These tests proved some crucial design mistakes on the DRAGAR turret, which had to be redesigned. The 2 years delay in the programme are consequences of this design flaw.

As the programme reaches completion, other variants are being studied. A mortar version and a vehicle using the MILAN Missile have been considered by the developer. Note that none of these variants are being developed as of now, but feasibility studies are being conducted. In June 2007, VBCI was being considered for the British FRES programme.

France originally planned to buy 550 VCI and 150 of the VPC command version, but this was cut to 510 and 120 respectively with deliveries until 2015. The €3.49bn (FY2012) project will deliver 630 units at a unit cost of €3.49m (~US$4.8m) for the VCI and €2.74m (~US$3.7m) for the VPC, or €5.5m (~US$7.4m) per vehicle including development costs.

The 200th VBCI was delivered to the French army on 23 June 2010. The 400th VBCI was delivered to the French army on 12 June 2012. The first unit to be equipped with the new infantry fighting vehicle was the 35th Infantry Regiment in Belfort. The 500th VBCI was delivered to the French Army on 8 July 2013.  Delivery of 110 command post vehicles has been completed.

At Eurosatory 2014, Nexter unveiled improvements to the VBCI IFV variant following trials.  The rear wheels have steering to reduce its turning radius to 20 meters, and rear internal volume was increased by moving electrical equipment to the front of the vehicle.  To make room for the equipment, the driver's seat was pulled back and two sloping angles were added to the front end for the driver to maintain visibility. In September 2014, the French Army Procurement Agency (DGA) declared the qualification of a new version of the VBCI with a 32-ton gross vehicle weight, compared to 29 tons previously.  The increase in gross weight allows the vehicle to have better protection and preserves its capability to be upgraded. The 32-ton configuration will be delivered to the French armed forces starting in 2015.

Export

United Kingdom
In July 2014, France agreed to loan 19 VBCIs to the British Army for testing. The British Army was reportedly interested in the vehicle for its Mechanised Infantry Vehicle program. In February 2014, it was reported that the French Army may purchase the British Watchkeeper WK450 unmanned aerial vehicle if the British Army bought the VBCI. However, in November 2019, the British Army confirmed its selection of Boxer for its MIV program.

Qatar
In December 2017, during a visit by French President Emmanuel Macron, Qatar announced it intended to purchase 490 Nexter VBCI vehicles. Negotiations continue to be under way for the exact loadout of the 490 vehicles, with American, British, French, Norwegian and Belgian firms bidding for turret systems among other systems.

In March 2018, it was reported Kongsberg would supply unmanned medium-calibre turrets and Protector remote weapons stations in the event that Qatar ordered the VBCIs in a contract worth up to US$1.94 billion.

Specifications

C4ISR 
The VBCI will be completely integrated in the French C4ISR capability. The VCI version will use the SIT (Système d’Information Terminal — The lowest level of C4IST in the French forces), while the VPC will use the SIR (Système d’Information Régimentaire — A higher level in the same system).

The vehicle will be designed to primarily carry soldiers equipped with the FÉLIN system.

DRAGAR Turret 
The DRAGAR Turret (GIAT INDUSTRIES) is a single seat modular design turret integrating a 25 mm stabilized gun. Fire control integrates a laser rangefinder and a thermal camera. The rate of fire is up to 400 rounds/min, and the turret allows anti-air self-defence. It also includes a coaxial 7.62 mm machine gun for close defence and a Galix grenade launching system.  The turret adds  to a vehicle's weight.

Variants

French variants

VCI (infantry fighting vehicle): Combat group of 9 men (+ crew), medium calibre Dragar type turret (25 mm), 7.62 mm machine gun.
VPC (command post vehicle): 2 SIP stations with 7 men (+ crew), self-defence turret armed with a 12.7 mm machine gun.

Export variants
VTT (Troop Transport Vehicle): It is designed to transport troops. It has an interior volume of 13 m³ and can carry a 2-man crew and up to 10 soldiers with their equipment. The VTT is sized to meet export requirements and is currently being considered by several national armies.
Common features for all variants include SIT (Système d’Information Terminal) communication equipment, combat identification equipment, and NBC detection and protection equipment.

VBCI 2
The VBCI 2 is an improved version, intended for export sales, with new engine (600 hp Volvo D13 turbocharged diesel engine), new air conditioner, and new vision cameras. It is heavier (32 t) and the prototype is equipped with a T40 two-man turret (40mm gun).

See also

Comparable vehicles

 Stryker
 LAV III/LAV AFV/LAV-25/ASLAV
 Amphibious Combat Vehicle
 K808 Armored Personnel Carrier
 Tusan AFV
 Eitan AFV
 Boxer
 Freccia IFV
 BTR-90
 VPK-7829 Bumerang
 CM-32
 ZBL-08
 Type 96 Armored Personnel Carrier
 Type 16 maneuver combat vehicle
 Patria AMV
 BTR-4
 Saur 2
 KTO Rosomak
 FNSS Pars
 MOWAG Piranha

References

External links 

 VBCI Nexter Data Sheet - Pictures - Video
 Janes
  Nexter
 VBCI Program Update

Wheeled infantry fighting vehicles
Infantry fighting vehicles of France
Wheeled amphibious armoured fighting vehicles
Nexter Systems
Eight-wheeled vehicles
Military vehicles introduced in the 2000s
Amphibious infantry fighting vehicles
Infantry fighting vehicles of the post–Cold War period